The Oued El-Had and Mezouara massacre took place on 3 August 1997 in two villages near Arib in the wilaya of Ain Defla, Algeria.  Guerrillas killed 40-76 civilians.  Algeria-Watch's timeline describes them as strange guerrillas with shaven heads and eyebrows, carrying flags emblazoned "Angry at God".

See also
List of massacres in Algeria

External links
Abed Charef
Timeline
Troubles
La Tribune

Algerian massacres of the 1990s
1997 in Algeria
Conflicts in 1997
Massacres in 1997
August 1997 events in Africa